Mark Michael Brzezicki (born 21 June 1957) is an English musician, best known as the drummer for the Scottish rock band Big Country. He has also played with the Cult, Ultravox, From the Jam, Procol Harum, Rick Astley, the Crazy World of Arthur Brown, Roger Daltrey, Fish, Steve Harley, Howard Jones, Nik Kershaw, the Pretenders, Thunderclap Newman, Tiffany, Midge Ure, Pete Townshend and many others. Brzezicki was also the sole drummer on Shine, the second (and final, to date) English-language studio album by Swedish singer Anni-Frid Lyngstad of ABBA. He uses both the traditional and matched grips.

He is the son of an English mother and a Polish veteran of the Second World War. Brzezicki left Big Country in July 1989, but rejoined in 1993. He, together with bassist Tony Butler and guitarist Bruce Watson, began gigging again as Big Country in 2007, as part of their 25th anniversary tour.

In 2004, Brzezicki helped form a new band, Casbah Club, with Bruce Foxton and Simon Townshend.

Smash Hits magazine had a running gag in the 1980s wherein they referred to the drummer as "Mark Unpronounceablename of Big Country". On Pete Townshend's All the Best Cowboys Have Chinese Eyes (1982) and White City: A Novel (1985) albums, there are joking references to the spelling of Brzezicki's last name.

His brother Steve is a session bassist with whom he frequently collaborates.

On 10 October 2009, Mark Brzezicki rejoined the Cult onstage at the Royal Albert Hall in London. He joined original members Ian Astbury, Billy Duffy and Jamie Stewart, with whom he had recorded their Love (1985) album, to perform "The Phoenix" and "She Sells Sanctuary" as a second and final encore to a live performance of Love.

See also
 List of drummers

References

External links
 Official Myspace page
 
 
 
 
 Short bio page from Drummerworld
 Official Big Country website
 Beyond the Pale (a semi-official Procol Harum website)

1957 births
Living people
English rock drummers
Big Country members
Procol Harum members
The Cult members
Ultravox members
British people of Polish descent
People from Slough
Casbah Club members